Murphy Lakes is a group of lakes in Lincoln County, Wyoming, United States. Murphy Lakes lie at an elevation of 6762 feet (2061 m).

References

Lakes of Wyoming
Lakes of Lincoln County, Wyoming